Teppo Hauta-aho (May 27, 1941 – November 27, 2021) was a Finnish double bassist and composer.

Early life and studies
Hauta-aho was born in Janakkala, near Hämeenlinna, on May 27, 1941. He studied the double bass at the Sibelius Academy from 1963 to 1970 and with František Pošta in Prague.

Later life and career
From 1965 to 1972, Hauta-aho played with the Helsinki Philharmonic Orchestra. From 1975, he was with the Finnish National Opera Orchestra. In 1999 he performed with Brazilian tenor saxophonist Ivo Perelman, Irish-Swiss pianist John Wolf Brennan and Finish drummer Teppo Mäkynen at Kerava Festival. One of his best known works, Fantasia, for trumpet and orchestra, won the 1986 Queen Maria Jose competition in Geneva. Another, Kadenza, has been the set piece for international music competitions and has been played at music festivals.

He was self-taught as a composer, and his compositions included a double bass concerto, chamber music and works for the double bass.

Discography
With Tuohi Klang
Pensselman Hits vol. 2765 (Finnlevy, 1972)(re-issue Svart Records,2022)
With Juhani Aaltonen
Etiquette (Love, 1974)
With Pekka Pöyry
Happy Peter (Leo, 1984)
With Anthony Braxton
2 Compositions (Järvenpää) 1988 (Leo, 1988 [1996])
With Evan Parker
The Needles (Leo, 2000–01)
With Cecil Taylor
Lifting the Bandstand (Fundacja Słuchaj!, 2021)
With Edward Vesala
Nan Madol (JAPO, 1974)
Soulset/Edward Vesala Jazz Band (Finnlevy, 1969)(re-issue Svart Records,2018)
With Heikki “Mike” Koskinen
Kellari Trio (Edgetone Records, 2015)
Mike Koskinen Orchestra (Finnlevy, 1973)(re-issue Svart Records,2016)
August Conversations (Edgetone Records, 2019)
With Otherworld Ensemble
Live at Malmitalo (Edgetone Records, 2018)
Northern Fire (Edgetone Records, 2018)
Return From Manala (Edgetone Records, 2020)

Sources:

References

External links 

1941 births
2021 deaths
Musicians from Helsinki
Classical double-bassists
Finnish composers
Finnish male composers
Finnish double-bassists
Male double-bassists
Finnish jazz composers
21st-century double-bassists
Male jazz composers
21st-century male musicians